Joan of Bar (died 1361) was a French-English noble. She acted as regent of the County of Bar from 1344 until 1353. 

She was a daughter of Henry III, Count of Bar and Eleanor of England, and niece of Edward II of England. She was unhappily married to John de Warenne, 7th Earl of Surrey. In 1345, Joan became the regent of Bar for her great-nephew Robert.

Life

On 25 May 1306, Joan was married to one of the leading nobles of England, John de Warenne, 7th Earl of Surrey, a "nasty, brutal man with scarcely one redeeming quality". She lived at the Warenne family estates, Conisbrough Castle and Sandal Castle, abandoned by her husband, who hated her and since 1313 had been trying to divorce her. In England, she was close to Isabella of France, her aunt by marriage (Isabella’s husband Edward II was Joan’s maternal uncle) who was about her same age, and spent time with her at court. She was probably close to her cousin Elizabeth de Clare, who left Joan an image of John the Baptist in her will.

After four unhappy years of marriage, Surrey alleged in 1313 that the union was unlawful because Joan was related to him in the third and fourth degree, and because he had been "precontracted" to Maud of Nerford, his longtime mistress and the mother of his children, before marrying Joan. Despite his claims, a divorce was never granted.

In 1345, Joan was invited by Philip VI of France to act as regent of the County of Bar.

In 1353, she returned to England. When John II of France was captured and imprisoned in London, she was allowed to visit him and is said to have become his mistress.

Joan died in 1361 in London.

References

Sources

114

1297 births
1361 deaths
14th-century women rulers
House of Montbelliard
English countesses